Shrigonda  Taluka, is a taluka in Karjat subdivision of Ahmednagar District in Maharashtra State of India. Its administrative headquarters is the town of Shrigonda.

Area
The table below shows area of the taluka by land type.

Villages
There are around 115 villages in Shrigonda taluka. Pedgaon is famous village in shrigonda.

Population
The table below shows population of the taluka by sex.  The data is as per 2001 census.

Rain Fall
The Table below details of rainfall from year 1981 to 2004.

See also
 Talukas in Ahmednagar district
 Villages in Shrigonda taluka

References

Cities and towns in Ahmednagar district
Talukas in Ahmednagar district
Talukas in Maharashtra